Between The Dim & The Dark is a 2004 album by alternative rock band Jump, Little Children.

Track listing
"Dim and The Dark" - 4:49			
"Hold You Down" - 3:33			
"Rains in Asia" - 4:00			
"Mexico" - 4:33			
"Education" - 4:21			
"Young America" - 4:13			
"Broken" - 3:30			
"Requiem" - 5:26			
"Midnight" - 4:51				
"Daylight" - 5:26

Personnel
Rick Beato - Engineer, Mixing, Producer
Even Bivins - Drums, Group Member, Percussion
Matthew Bivins - Accordion, Group Member, Harmonica, Mandolin
Jay Clifford - Group Member, Guitar, Keyboards, Vocals
Matt Evans - Violin
Les Hall - Keyboards, Piano
Jump, Little Children - Primary Artist
Amanda Kapousouz - Violin
Ward Williams - Cello, Dobro, Group Member, Guitar

Chart positions

References

2004 albums
Jump, Little Children albums